Roy Villa is a four storied building situated at Lebong Cart Road, Darjeeling, West Bengal. The building holds a special significance in being the Death place of Sister Nivedita, the disciple of Swami Vivekananda who died on 13 October 1911.

History of Roy Villa 

This European castle-like structure is around 115 years old and is named after its original owner, Dwarakanath Roy. He was the brother of Mr. P. K. Roy, the first ever Principal of the Presidency College. Famous scientist & botanist Acharya Jagadish Chandra Bose rented this premises from his friend, Dwarakanath Roy due to its weather and ambience in summer. Later, when Sister Nivedita’s health was deteriorating, he & Lady Abala Bose invited Sister Nivedita to stay in this house. Sister Nivedita liked this place due to the soothing weather and started to live discreetly with them. Apart from Mr. & Mrs. Bose, famous Doctor Nil Ratan Sarkar and scientist Basiswar Sen were also present in the Roy Villa when Sister Nivedita died in 1911. 
From 1903 to 1911, Sister Nivedita stayed at Darjeeling for around 242 days in 7 different visits.

Later Stage 
For several years, Roy Villa was abandoned until The Himalayan Mountaineering Institute took the place as its starting operation in 1954 when it was inaugurated by the then prime minister Pandit Jawaharlal Nehru. Initially there were 20 students who were taught in the Roy Villa but once the number of students increased, The Himalayan Mountaineering Institute shifted its base to the Western Spur of Birch Hill on 25 December 1957. For several years, Roy Villa was under the Youth Services Department of Govt. of West Bengal and then to the Gorkhaland Territorial Administration (GTA) before it was finally handed over to the Ramakrishna Mission.

New Life of Roy Villa 
After a series of discussion between GTA & State Government with the presence of Association for Conservation and Tourism, the Siliguri-based NGO who proposed to make Roy Villa a heritage site and Ramakrishna Mission, it has been decided that Roy Villa will be handed over. Mamata Banerjee handed over the Roy Villa to the Ramakrishna Mission in presence of Swami Suhitanandaji, General Secretary of Ramakrishna Math and Ramakrishna Mission, Belur Math on 16 May 2013. Finally, the key of the Roy Villa was handed over to Secretary of Ramakrishna Mission Nivedita Educational and Cultural Centre, a branch centre of Ramakrishna Mission, Belur Math on 10 July 2013, the auspicious day of Ratha Jatra by Sri Gautam Deb, Minister In - charge of North Bengal Development Department. State Government has sanctioned Rs. 1 crore for its restoration and its Information & Cultural Department will look after the heritage building.

Present Status 
Newly revamped & restored Roy Villa is now under the control of Ramakrishna Mission, and they have taken a series of projects to run from this premises. Her picture, old writing desk, chair, table lamp stand, wall clock, typewriter, the old styled electric wiring are there to remember her presence always.

Apart from this, Nivedita Educational & Cultural Center has some more plans to execute:

 Free Computer Training Centre
 Free coaching center for joint entrance examinees and IAS / IPS aspirants
 Skill Development Centre for empowering women
 School of Languages
Exhibition on the life of Sister Nivedita
Gadadhar Abhyudaya Prakalpa for uplifting local children
 Monthly Ration amounting to 1,000/- to old-aged mothers
 Monthly Medical Camp with free Medicine

13 students in the last 1 year became financially benefited to procure books and 4 poor yet meritorious students received a scholarship of Rs. 12000/-. With this new approach, Roy Villa is moving ahead to provide service to mankind and is the focal point of Ramakrishna Mission in North Bengal.

Recent News

Visit of Honourable governor Keshari Nath Tripathi 

Honorable governor Keshari Nath Tripathi visited the Centre on 6 June 2016.

References

External links

 History of Roy Villa
 Roy Villa, Reborn of Heritage
 Darjeeling - The Queen of the Hills
 Business Standard:Tourist centre around Sister Nivedita's Darjeeling house: Mamata
 Remembering Sister Nivedita on her Birth Anniversary
 Mungpoo News: Darjeeling Roy Villa handed over to Ramakrishna Mission
 The Telegraph: Roy Villa for govt, hostel for GTA Mamata, Gurung swap buildings

Moderator: Saikat Gupta

Buildings and structures in Darjeeling
Ramakrishna Mission